The 2002 Pacific typhoon season was a slightly above average Pacific typhoon season, producing twenty-six named storms, fifteen becoming typhoons, and eight super typhoons. It was an event in the annual cycle of tropical cyclone formation, in which tropical cyclones form in the western Pacific Ocean. The season ran throughout 2002, though most tropical cyclones typically develop between May and October. The season's first named storm, Tapah, developed on January 11, while the season's last named storm, Pongsona, dissipated on December 11. The season's first typhoon, Mitag, reached typhoon status on March 1, and became the first super typhoon of the year four days later.

The scope of this article is limited to the Pacific Ocean, to the north of the equator between 100°E and the 180th meridian. Within the northwestern Pacific Ocean, there are two separate agencies that assign names to tropical cyclones, which can often result in a cyclone having two names, one from the JMA and one from PAGASA. The Japan Meteorological Agency (JMA) will name a tropical cyclone should it be judged to have 10-minute sustained wind speeds of at least  anywhere in the basin, while the Philippine Atmospheric, Geophysical and Astronomical Services Administration (PAGASA) assigns names to tropical cyclones which move into or form as a tropical depression in their area of responsibility located between 135°E and 115°E and between 5°N–25°N regardless of whether or not a tropical cyclone has already been given a name by the JMA. Tropical depressions that are monitored by the United States' Joint Typhoon Warning Center (JTWC) are given a number with a "W" suffix.

Seasonal forecasts 

On March 6, meteorologists from University College London at TropicalStormRisk.com issued a forecast for the season for above average activity, since sea surface temperatures were expected to be slightly warmer than usual; the group used data by the Joint Typhoon Warning Center (JTWC), and compared the potential 28.6 storms to the 30-year average of 26.3. The group raised the number of predicted storms in April to 29.6, and again in early May to 30.5. They ultimately overestimated the number of storms that would form. The Laboratory for Atmospheric Research at the City University of Hong Kong also issued a season forecast in April 2002, predicting 27 storms with a margin of error of 3, of which 11 would become typhoons, with a margin of error of 2. The agency noted a stronger than normal subtropical ridge over the open Pacific Ocean, as well as ongoing El Niño conditions that favored development, but expected below-normal development in the South China Sea. These predictions proved to be largely accurate.

During the year, the Japan Meteorological Agency (JMA) issued advisories on tropical cyclones west of the International Date Line to the Malay Peninsula, and north of the equator, in its role as the official Regional Specialized Meteorological Center, as designated by the World Meteorological Organization in 1989. The JMA issued forecasts and analyses every six hours starting at midnight UTC using numerical weather prediction (NWP) and a climatological tropical cyclone forecast model. They used the Dvorak technique and NWP to estimate 10-minute sustained winds and barometric pressure. The JTWC also issued warnings on storms within the basin, operating from Pearl Harbor in Hawaii and supplying forecasts to the United States Armed Forces in the Indian and Pacific Oceans. The agency moved their backup facility from Yokosuka in Japan to Monterey, California in 2002. Several meteorologists left the agency near the beginning of the year, although the new forecasters compensated for their inexperience by relying on the consensus of various forecast models. In 2002, the JTWC began experimenting with five-day forecasts.

Season summary 

The activity was an active season, with many tropical cyclones affecting Japan and China. Every month had tropical activity, with most storms forming from July through October. Overall, there were 44 tropical depressions declared officially or unofficially, of which 26 became named storms; of those, there were 15 typhoons, which is the equivalent of a minimal hurricane, while 8 of the 15 typhoon intensified into super typhoons unofficially by the JTWC. The season began early with the first storm, Tapah, developing on January 10, east of the Philippines. Two months later, Typhoon Mitag became the first super typhoon  ever to be recorded in March. In June, Typhoon Chataan dropped heavy rainfall in the Federated States of Micronesia, killing 48 people and becoming the deadliest natural disaster in the state of Chuuk. Chataan later left heavy damage in Guam before striking Japan. In August, Typhoon Rusa became the deadliest typhoon in South Korea in 43 years, causing 238 deaths and $4.2 billion in damage. Typhoon Higos in October was the fifth strongest typhoon to strike Tokyo since World War II. The final typhoon of the season was Typhoon Pongsona, which was one of the costliest storms on record in Guam; it did damage worth $700 million on the island before dissipating on December 11.

The season began early, but did not become active until June, when six storms passed near or over Japan after a ridge weakened. Nine storms developed in July, many of which influenced the monsoon trough over the Philippines to produce heavy rainfall and deadly flooding. The flooding was worst in Luzon, where 85 people were killed. The series of storms caused the widespread closure of schools and offices. Many roads were damaged, and the floods left about $1.8 million (₱94.2 million PHP) in crop damage, largely to rice and corn. Overall damage from the series of storms was estimated at $10.3 million (₱522 million PHP). From June to September, heavy rainfall affected large portions of China, resulting in devastating flooding that killed over 1,500 people and left $8.2 billion (¥68 billion CNY) in damage. During this time, Tropical Storm Kammuri struck southern China with a large area of rainfall that damaged or destroyed 245,000 houses. There were 153 deaths related to the storm, mostly inland in Hunan, and damage totaled $322 million (¥2.665 billion CNY). Activity shifted farther to the east after September, with Typhoon Higos striking Japan in October and Typhoon Pongsona hitting Guam in December.

During most of the year, sea surface temperatures were above normal near the equator, and were highest around 160° E from January to July, and in November. Areas of convection developed farther east than usual, causing many storms to develop east of 150° E. The average point of formation was 145.9° E, the easternmost point since 1951. Partially as a result, no tropical storms made landfall in the Philippines for the first time since 1951, according to the JMA. Two storms – Ele and Huko – entered the basin from the Central Pacific, east of the International Date Line. Overall, there were 26 named storms in the basin in 2002, which was slightly below the norm of 26.7. A total of 15 of the 26 storms became typhoons, a slightly higher than normal proportion.

Systems

Tropical Storm Tapah (Agaton) 

The first storm of the season was Tropical Storm Tapah, which formed on January 9 near Palau. It developed from the monsoon trough and was first observed by the JTWC two days before its formation. The system initially consisted of an area of convection with a weak circulation, located in an area of weak wind shear. On January 10, the JMA classified the system as a tropical depression, the same day that the JTWC initiated advisories on Tropical Depression 01W and PAGASA classified it as "Agaton". The storm moved west-northwestward due to a ridge to the north, and the system gradually became better organized. An approaching trough weakened the ridge, which turned the storm to the northwest. Due to increasing wind shear, convection gradually weakened, and the JMA downgraded Tapah to a tropical depression on January 13; however, other agencies maintained the system as a tropical storm. The next day, Tapah dissipated along the eastern coast of Luzon in the Philippines.

Typhoon Mitag (Basyang) 

Typhoon Mitag developed from a trough near the equator on February 25 near the Federated States of Micronesia (FSM). It moved westward through the archipelago and intensified into a typhoon, before passing near Yap on March 2. High winds and heavy rainfall affected the state, causing an islandwide power outage and destroying hundreds of houses. Mitag severely damaged crops, resulting in food shortages. The rainfall and storm surge flooded much of the coastline as well as Yap's capital, Colonia. Damage totaled $150 million, mostly to crops. There was one death related to the storm's aftermath.

After affecting Yap, Mitag turned to the northwest and later to the north due to an approaching trough. It passed to the north of Palau, contributing to one death there. The combination of cooler air and interaction with the westerlies caused Mitag to weaken significantly. Only four days after reaching peak winds, the storm had dissipated well to the east of the Philippines.

Tropical Depression 03W (Caloy) 

On March 15, the JTWC began monitoring a tropical disturbance, and four days later upgraded it to a tropical depression near Palau. The next day, both the JMA and PAGASA classified the system as a depression, and PAGASA named it "Caloy". Moving west-northwestward due to a ridge to the north, the depression moved across the Philippine island of Mindanao on March 21 and continued through the archipelago. Owing to strong wind shear, the system never intensified, and the JMA discontinued advisories on March 23 after the system reached the South China Sea. The JTWC maintained the system as a tropical depression until March 25, when a mid-latitude trough absorbed the system off the east coast of Vietnam.

Heavy rains from the depression affected the southern Philippines, causing flash flooding and landslides. The storm damaged 2,703 homes, including 215 that were destroyed. Damage totaled about $2.4 million (₱124 million PHP). There were 35 deaths in the Philippines, mostly in Surigao del Sur in Mindanao from drownings.

Typhoon Hagibis 

The monsoon trough spawned a tropical disturbance near the Caroline Islands in the middle of May. By that time, the system was an area of convection with a weak circulation, although the system organized as outflow improved. It tracked northwestward within the monsoon trough, steered by a mid-level ridge. The developing storm dropped rainfall on Guam that ended the island's wildfire season. The storm quickly intensified, developing an eye feature later that day. Early on May 18, the JMA upgraded Hagibis to a typhoon, and around that time, an approaching trough turned the storm to the northeast.

While accelerating northeastward, Hagibis developed a well-defined eye and underwent a period of rapid deepening. Hagibis only maintained its peak for about 12 hours, after which the eye began weakening. The trough that caused the typhoon's acceleration also caused the storm to lose tropical characteristics, and dry air gradually became entrained in the circulation. On May 21, Hagibis became extratropical to the east of Japan after having weakened below typhoon intensity. The remnants continued to the northeast and dissipated south of the Aleutian Islands on May 22.

Severe Tropical Storm Noguri (Espada) 

In early June, a disturbance within the monsoon trough persisted in the South China Sea to the east of Vietnam. On June 4, a tropical depression developed just off the east coast of Hainan, with a broad circulation and scattered convection. The system tracked slowly eastward due to a ridge to the north, and conditions favored intensification, including favorable outflow and minimal wind shear. The JTWC initiated advisories on June 6, and despite the favorable conditions, the depression remained weak. On June 7, the system briefly entered the area of responsibility of PAGASA, and the agency named it Espada. Later that day, the JTWC upgraded the depression to a tropical storm, and on June 8 the JMA upgraded the depression to Tropical Storm Noguri halfway between Taiwan and Luzon. Increased outflow from an approaching trough allowed the storm to quickly intensify. The JTWC upgraded Noguri to a typhoon late on June 8, after an eye developed. By that time, the storm was moving to the northeast due to a building ridge to the southeast. Increasing wind shear weakened Noguri, and the storm passed just west of the Miyako-jima on June 9. The convection diminished, and the JTWC declared Noguri extratropical while the storm was approaching Japan. The JMA continued tracking the storm until it dissipated over the Kii Peninsula on June 11.

The threat of the storm prompted school closures and 20 airline flight cancellations. Noguri injured one person, damaged one house, and caused about $4 million (¥504 million JPY) in agricultural damage. The name Noguri was then changed as “Neoguri” due to a misspelling.

Typhoon Rammasun (Florita) 

Typhoon Rammasun was the first of four typhoons to contribute to heavy rainfall and deadly flooding in the Philippines in July 2002; there were 85 deaths related to the four storms, with 2,463 homes damaged or destroyed. Rammasun developed around the same time as Typhoon Chataan, but farther to the west. Rammasun turned northward, passing east of Taiwan and China. In Taiwan, the outer rainbands dropped rainfall that alleviated drought conditions. In contrast, rainfall in China followed previously wet conditions, resulting in additional flooding, although less damage than expected; there was about $85 million in crop and fishery damage in Zhejiang.

After affecting Taiwan and China, Rammasun began weakening due to an approaching trough, which turned the typhoon northeastward. It passed over the Japanese island of Miyako-jima and also produced strong winds in Okinawa. About 10,000 houses lost power on the island, and high surf killed two sailors. On the Japanese mainland, there was light crop damage and one serious injury. After weakening to a tropical storm, Rammasun passed just west of the South Korean island of Jejudo, where high waves killed one person. The storm crossed the country, killing three others and leaving $9.5 million in damage. High rains also affected North Korea and Primorsky Krai in the Russian Far East.

Typhoon Chataan (Gloria) 

Typhoon Chataan formed on June 28, 2002, near the FSM, and for several days it meandered while producing heavy rainfall across the region. There was also one death on nearby Pohnpei, and damage in the FSM totaled over $100 million.

After affecting the FSM, Chataan began a northwest track as an intensifying typhoon. Its eye passed just north of Guam on July 4, though the eyewall moved across the island and dropped heavy rainfall. Flooding and landslides from the storm severely damaged or destroyed 1,994 houses. Damage on the island totaled $60.5 million, and there were 23 injuries. The typhoon also affected Rota in the Northern Mariana Islands with gusty winds and light rainfall. It weakened while turning to the north, and after diminishing to a tropical storm, Chataan struck eastern Japan on July 10. Damage in Japan totaled about $500 million (¥59 billion JPY).

Typhoon Halong (Inday) 

The monsoon trough spawned a tropical depression on July 5 near the Marshall Islands, near where Chataan originated. For much of its duration, Halong moved toward the northwest, gradually intensifying into a tropical storm. Early on July 10, Halong passed just south of Guam as a tropical storm, according to the JMA, although the JTWC assessed it as a typhoon near the island. It had threatened to strike the island less than a week after Chataan's damaging landfall, and although Halong remained south of Guam, it produced high waves and gusty winds on the island. The storm disrupted relief efforts following Chataan, causing additional power outages but little damage.

After affecting Guam, Halong quickly strengthened into a typhoon and reached its peak winds on July 12. The typhoon weakened greatly while curving to the northeast, although its winds caused widespread power outages on Okinawa. Halong struck southeastern Japan, dropping heavy rainfall and producing strong winds that left $89.8 million (¥10.3 billion JPY) in damage. There was one death in the country and nine injuries. Halong became extratropical on July 16 and dissipated the next day.

Severe Tropical Storm Nakri (Hambalos) 

A circulation formed on July 7 in the South China Sea, with associated convection located to the south. Outflow increased as the system became better organized, and late on July 7 a tropical depression formed to the southwest of Taiwan. A ridge located over the Philippines caused the system to track northeastward. Early on July 9, the JMA upgraded the depression to Tropical Storm Nakri near western Taiwan. It was a small storm, and while moving along the northern portion of the island, Nakri weakened as its convection diminished. The monsoon trough turned Nakri to the east for two days, until a weakening ridge turned it to the north on July 12. That day, the storm passed just west of Okinawa, and shortly thereafter Nakri weakened to a tropical depression, after experiencing cooler waters and increasing shear. On July 13, Nakri dissipated west of Kyushu.

While passing over Taiwan, Nakri dropped heavy rainfall that reached  at Pengjia Islet. A total of  fell in one day at the Feitsui Dam, representing the highest daily total at that point in the year. Taiwan had experienced drought conditions prior to earlier Typhoon Rammasun, and additional rainfall from Nakri eliminated all remaining water restrictions. Airline flights were canceled throughout the region due to the storm, and some schools and offices were closed. Nakri killed one fisherman and a shipworker during its passage. High rains also affected southeastern China, and later Okinawa. The storm induced heavy rainfall in the Philippines, as well as in Japan, where landslides and flooding were reported along a cold front.

Typhoon Fengshen 

The monsoon trough spawned a tropical depression on July 13, which quickly intensified due to its small size. By July 15, Fengshen attained typhoon status, and after initially moving to the north, it began a movement toward the northwest. This broke the record for longest duration at that intensity, previously set by Typhoon Joan in 1997, and later tied by Typhoon Ioke in 2006.

While near peak intensity, Typhoon Fengshen underwent the Fujiwhara effect with Typhoon Fung-wong, causing the latter storm to loop to its south. Fengshen gradually weakened while approaching Japan, and it crossed over the country's Ōsumi Islands on July 25 as a severe tropical storm. When the typhoon washed a freighter ashore, four people drowned and the remaining fifteen were rescued. In the country, Fengshen dropped heavy rainfall and produced heavy rains, causing mudslides, $4 million (¥475 million JPY) in crop damage, and one death. After affecting Japan, Fengshen weakened in the Yellow Sea to a tropical depression, before moving across China's Shandong Peninsula and dissipating on July 28.

Tropical Depression 13W (Juan) 

On July 16, an area of convection increased northwest of Palau with a weak circulation. Moderate shear dispersed the thunderstorms, although the system gradually organized. It tracked northwestward due to a ridge to the north, becoming a tropical depression on July 18. PAGASA gave the system the local name "Juan", and the JTWC classified it as Tropical Depression 13W, although the JMA did not classify it as a tropical storm. Early on July 19, the depression struck Samar Island in the Philippines, and continued northwestward through the archipelago. An increase in convection the next day prompted the JTWC to upgrade the system to a tropical storm before it moved over Luzon and the Metro Manila area. Increasing shear and disrupted outflow due to land interaction weakened the system, and the JTWC discontinued advisories on July 22. PAGASA continued tracking the system until the following day.

The depression dropped heavy rainfall in the Philippines during its passage, only weeks after several consecutive tropical systems caused deadly flooding in the country. The rains forced 2,400 people to evacuate. Storm-related tornadoes and landslides killed at least three people. Three people were electrocuted, and flash flooding killed at least two people. In all, Tropical Depression Juan killed 14 people and injured two others. There were 583 houses that were damaged or destroyed, and damage totaled about $240,000 (₱12.1 million PHP), mostly on Luzon.

Typhoon Fung-wong (Kaka) 

A small circulation formed northeast of the Northern Marianas Islands on July 18. Later that day, the JMA classified the system as a tropical depression. Convection and outflow increased the next day, and the system moved slowly westward due to a ridge over Japan. After further organization, the JTWC initiated advisories on July 20 while the depression was just southwest of Iwo Jima. Shortly thereafter, the JMA upgraded it to Tropical Storm Fung-Wong. On July 22, the storm began undergoing the Fujiwhara effect with the larger Typhoon Fengshen to the east, causing Fung-wong to turn southwestward. Around that time, the storm entered PAGASA's region, earning it the local name "Kaka". It turned to the south and later southeast while interacting with the larger Fengshen, which passed north of it. On July 25, the typhoon weakened to a severe tropical storm while at the southernmost point of its track. The storm turned to the north and completed a large loop between the Ryukyu and Northern Marianas Islands that day. The combination of cooler waters, wind shear, and dry air caused weakening, and the storm deteriorated into a tropical depression on July 27. Passing a short distance south of Kyushu, Fung-wong dissipated later that day.

The storm dropped heavy rainfall in Japan, reaching  at a station in Miyazaki Prefecture. The rains caused two landslides and resulted in delays to bus and train systems, as well as cancellations to ferry and airline routes. There was also minor crop damage.

Tropical Storm Kalmaegi 

A tropical disturbance developed on July 17 in the Central Pacific Ocean, near the International Date Line. The system crossed the line shortly thereafter and quickly intensified into Tropical Storm Kalmaegi. The JMA classified the system as a tropical storm, although the JTWC maintained it as a tropical depression. Kalmaegi moved northwestward due to a ridge to the north, and initially a tropical upper tropospheric trough provided favorable conditions. However, the trough soon increased wind shear and restricted outflow, which caused quick weakening. The thunderstorms diminished from the circulation, and around 12:00 UTC on July 22, Kalmaegi dissipated about 30 hours after forming.

Severe Tropical Storm Kammuri (Lagalag) 

A large monsoonal system persisted toward the end of July 2002 near the Philippines. On August 2, a tropical depression formed off the northwest coast of Luzon and moved west-northwestward. Late on August 3, it intensified into Tropical Storm Kammuri off the coast of Hong Kong. A weakening ridge turned the storm northward toward the coast of China. The system dissipated over the mountainous coastline of eastern China and merged with a cold front on August 7.

High rainfall from Kammuri affected large portions of China, particularly in Guangdong province where it moved ashore. In Hong Kong, the rains caused a landslide and damaged a road. Two dams were destroyed in Guangdong by the flooding, and 10 people were killed by a landslide. Throughout the province, over 100,000 people had to evacuate due to flooding, and after 6,810 houses were destroyed. The floods damaged roads, railroads, and tunnels, and left power and water outages across the region. Rainfall was beneficial in alleviating drought conditions in Guangdong, although further inland the rains occurred after months of deadly flooding. In Hunan Province, the storm's remnants merged with a cold front and destroyed 12,400 houses. Kammuri and its remnants killed 153 people, and damage was estimated at $509 million (¥4.219 billion CNY).

Tropical Depression 18W (Milenyo) 

A tropical depression developed on August 10 east of the Philippines. Initially it was disorganized due to hostile conditions, and it failed to intensify significantly before crossing the Philippine island of Luzon. There, flooding forced 3,500 people to evacuate their homes. In the Philippines, the storm killed 35 people and caused $3.3 million in damage, with 13,178 houses damaged or destroyed. It was the final storm named by PAGASA during the season.

After affecting the Philippines, the tropical depression moved into the South China Sea and dissipated on August 14. During the next day, despite separate systems, the remnants of 18W formed another system which would later intensify into Tropical Storm Vongfong.

Typhoon Phanfone 

The monsoon trough spawned a tropical depression on August 11, just west of Ujelang Atoll. It moved generally northwestward due to a ridge to the north, quickly intensifying into Tropical Storm Phanfone by August 12. With good outflow and developing rainbands, the storm continued to strengthen, becoming a typhoon on August 14. Phanfone developed a well-defined eye, surrounded by deep convection. Diminished outflow and an eyewall replacement cycle caused weakening, and it passed near Iwo Jima on August 16. Phanfone turned to the northeast two days later due to a weakening ridge, and dry air caused rapid deterioration. Passing southeast of Japan, it fell to tropical storm status on August 19 before becoming extratropical the next day; the remnants continued to the northeast and crossed the International Date Line on August 25.

Wind gusts on Iwo Jima reached . Rainfall in mainland Japan peaked at  near Tokyo, and the typhoon flooded 43 houses. High rains caused road damage and landslides, as well as some aquaculture damage. The storm caused 22 ferry routes and 10 flights to be canceled, and temporarily shut down refineries near Tokyo. On the offshore island of Hachijō-jima, high winds caused a temporary power outage.

Tropical Storm Vongfong 

A tropical depression formed in the South China Sea during August 15 from the remnants of 18W. It moved northwestward, strengthening into Tropical Storm Vongfong on August 18. It brushed eastern Hainan before making landfall on August 19 in southern China near Wuchuan, Guangdong. Soon after the circulation dissipated, it dropped heavy rainfall across the region. One person died in a traffic accident in Hong Kong, and landslides killed twelve people. The storm destroyed 6,000 houses, mostly in Guangdong, and damage in the country totaled at least $86 million.

Typhoon Rusa 

Typhoon Rusa developed on August 22 from the monsoon trough in the open Pacific Ocean, well to the southeast of Japan. For several days, Rusa moved to the northwest, eventually intensifying into a powerful typhoon. On August 26, the storm moved across the Amami Islands of Japan, where Rusa left 20,000 people without power and caused two fatalities.

It was able to maintain much of its intensity due to warm air and instability from a nearby cold front. Over 17,000 houses were damaged, and large areas of crop fields were flooded. In South Korea, Rusa killed at least 233 people, making it the deadliest typhoon in over 43 years, and caused $4.2 billion in damage. The typhoon also dropped heavy rainfall in neighboring North Korea, leaving 26,000 people homeless and killing three. Rusa also destroyed large areas of crops in the country, which was already affected by ongoing famine conditions. The typhoon became extratropical over eastern Russia on September 1, dissipating three days later.

Typhoon Sinlaku 

Sinlaku formed on August 27 northeast of the Northern Marianas Islands. After initially moving to the north, it began a generally westward motion that it maintained for the rest of its duration. Sinlaku strengthened into a typhoon and attained its peak winds on August 31. Over the next few days, it fluctuated slightly in intensity while moving over or near several Japanese islands. On September 4, the typhoon's eye crossed over Okinawa. It dropped heavy rainfall and produced strong winds that left over 100,000 people without power. Damage on the island was estimated at $14.3 million, including $3.6 million in damage to Kadena Air Base.

After affecting Okinawa, Sinlaku threatened northern Taiwan, which had been affected by two deadly typhoons in the previous year. Damage ended up being minimal on the island, although two people were killed. Sinlaku weakened slightly before making its final landfall in eastern China near Wenzhou on September 7. High rainfall and winds from Sinlaku wrecked 58,000 houses, and large areas of crops were destroyed. Damage in China was estimated at $709 million, and there were 28 deaths there.

Typhoon Ele 

An eastern extension of the monsoon trough southwest of Hawaii organized into Tropical Depression Two-C on August 27 and strengthened into Tropical Storm Ele six hours later. Despite the nearby presence of Alika, Ele developed rapidly and strengthened into a hurricane on August 28. After contributing to the demise of Alika, Ele intensified to winds of  before crossing the International Date Line on August 30.

Reclassified as a typhoon, Ele moved north-northwestward due to a weakness in the ridge to the north. On September 2, the JMA estimated peak 10-minute winds of  while Ele was northeast of Wake Atoll. The typhoon turned to the northeast due to an approaching trough, although Ele resumed its previous north-northwest motion after a ridge built behind the trough. It gradually weakened due to cooler waters and increasing wind shear, and on September 6 Ele deteriorated below typhoon status. The thunderstorms became detached from the circulation, causing Ele to weaken to a tropical depression late on September 9. By that time, it began moving to the northeast, and on September 10 it transitioned into an extratropical storm. The remnants of Ele continued to the northeast until moving back into the central Pacific as an extratropical storm on September 11 and dissipating on September 13.

Tropical Storm Hagupit 

An area of convection developed on September 8 to the northeast of Luzon. Moving to the west due to a ridge to the north, it slowly organized, forming into a tropical depression on September 9 in the South China Sea. At around 19:00 UTC on September 11, the storm made landfall west of Macau and quickly weakened into a tropical depression. The JTWC promptly discontinued advisories, although the JMA continued tracking Hagupit over land. The remnants executed a loop over Guangdong before moving offshore and dissipating on September 16 near Hong Kong.

The rains flooded widespread areas of crop fields and resulted in landslides. In Guangdong, 330 houses were destroyed, and damage was estimated at $32.5 million. In Hong Kong, 32 people were injured due to the storm, and 41 flights were canceled. In Fuzhou in Fujian Province, thunderstorms related to Hagupit flooded hundreds of houses. Further west in Jiangxi, floods from the storm destroyed 3,800 houses, ruined 180 bridges, and killed 25. Offshore, a helicopter rescued the crew of 25 from a sunken boat during the storm.

Tropical Storm Changmi 

An area of thunderstorms increased near the FSM on September 15 within the monsoon trough. Located within an area of moderate wind shear, its convection was intermittent around a weak circulation. On September 18, the JTWC issued a Tropical Cyclone Formation Alert (TCFA), and the JMA classified the system as a tropical depression; however, the two warning agencies were tracking different circulations within the same system, and by September 19 the circulation JMA was tracking became the dominant system. Shortly thereafter, the agency downgraded the system to a low-pressure area after it weakened. The next day, JMA again upgraded the system to a tropical depression, and the JTWC issued a second TCFA when the system had a partially exposed circulation near an area of increasing convection. Late on September 21, the JMA upgraded the depression to Tropical Storm Changmi to the south of Japan. However, the JTWC noted that the system was absorbing dry air and becoming extratropical, and thus did not issue warnings on the storm. Moving northeastward, Changmi became an extratropical cyclone on September 22, and gradually became more intense until crossing the International Date Line early on September 25.

Tropical Storm Mekkhala 

An elongated trough with associated convection developed in the South China Sea by September 21. Light shear and increasing outflow allowed the system to become better organized, and it formed into a tropical depression on September 22 between Vietnam and Luzon. A ridge to the northeast allowed the system to track northwestward. For several days the depression failed to organize further, despite favorable conditions; however, late on September 24 the circulation developed rainbands and a weak eye feature. At around 12:00 UTC on September 25, Mekkhala made landfall on western Hainan near peak intensity. Soon after, it moved into the Gulf of Tonkin and weakened due to land interaction and increasing shear. Mekkhala remained a weak tropical storm until September 28, when it weakened to a tropical depression and dissipated soon after in the extreme northern portion of the Gulf of Tonkin.

Along the island, high winds washed ashore or sank 20 boats, and 84 fishermen were rescued. Throughout Hainan, the high rains wrecked 2,500 houses and left $80.5 million in damage. High rains spread into southwestern China, particularly in Guangxi. In Beihai, the storm destroyed 335 houses, resulting in $22 million in damage.

Typhoon Higos 

Typhoon Higos developed on September 25 east of the Northern Marianas Islands. It tracked west-northwestward for its first few days, steadily intensifying into a powerful typhoon by September 29. Higos weakened and turned to the north-northeast toward Japan, making landfall in that country's Kanagawa Prefecture on October 1. Shortly thereafter, it crossed over Tokyo, becoming the third strongest typhoon to do so since World War II. It weakened while crossing Honshu, and shortly after striking Hokkaidō on October 2, Higos became extratropical. The remnants passed over Sakhalin and dissipated on October 4.

Before striking Japan, Higos produced strong winds in the Northern Marianas Islands while passing to their north. These winds damaged the food supply on two islands. A total of 608,130 buildings in the country were left without power, and two people were electrocuted in the storm's aftermath. The rains flooded houses across the country and caused mudslides. High waves washed 25 boats ashore and killed one person along the coast. Damage in the country totaled $2.14 billion (¥261 billion JPY), and there were five deaths. Later, the remnants of Higos affected the Russian Far East, killing seven people in two shipwrecks near Primorsky Krai.

Severe Tropical Storm Bavi 

A tropical disturbance organized within the monsoon trough in early October near the FSM. The convection gradually consolidated around a single circulation, developing into a tropical depression on October 8. Wind shear was weak and outflow was good, which allowed for slow strengthening; however, the system was elongated, with a separate circulation to the west. Around this time, the system produced gale-force winds on Kosrae in the FSM. Late on October 9, the JMA upgraded the depression to Tropical Storm Bavi to the east of Guam, although it was still a broad system at the time. After becoming a tropical storm, Bavi moved generally northward due to a ridge retreating to the northeast. By October 11, winds were fairly weak near the center and were stronger in outer rainbands. Shortly after reaching peak winds, the storm turned to the northeast and entered the westerlies. Increasing shear weakened the convection, and Bavi became extratropical on October 13. It continued to the northeast and crossed into the Central Pacific on October 16.

Severe Tropical Storm Maysak 

On October 25, an organized area of convection persisted southeast of Wake Island. With minimal wind shear, it quickly developed a circulation, becoming a tropical depression on October 26. Due to a ridge to the east, it moved generally northwestward and slowly intensified. Late on October 27, it strengthened into Tropical Storm Maysak. Initially, the system absorbed nearby dry air, although the storm was able to continue developing deep convection. On two occasions, the JTWC assessed Maysak as briefly intensifying into a typhoon, based on an eye feature, although increased shear later caused weakening. Continuing to the northeast, Maysak moved into the central Pacific Ocean on October 30, by which time it had become extratropical.

Typhoon Huko 

In the central Pacific Ocean, a tropical depression developed in the monsoon trough on October 24 to the south of Hawaii. It moved generally west-northwestward, intensifying into Tropical Storm Huko on October 26. It became a hurricane two days later, and briefly weakened back to tropical storm status before becoming a hurricane again on October 31. On November 3, Huko crossed the International Date Line into the western Pacific. It moved quickly to the west-northwest due to a strong ridge to its north. Huko moved through a weakness in the ridge, resulting in a turn to the north and northeast. Late on November 5, Huko weakened below typhoon status, and increasing shear caused further weakening. On November 7, Huko became extratropical, and later that day its remnants crossed back into the central Pacific. Several days later, the remnants affected northern California.

Typhoon Haishen 

In the middle of November, an area of thunderstorms developed southwest of Chuuk in the FSM within the monsoon trough. With weak shear and good outflow, it slowly organized, becoming a tropical depression on November 20. It moved quickly to the west-northwest, intensifying into Tropical Storm Haishen late on November 20 to the southeast of Guam. While passing south of the island, Haishen produced gale-force winds. The convection organized into a central dense overcast and developed an eye feature. Early on November 23, Haishen intensified into a typhoon; around that time, it began moving to the north due to an approaching trough. Soon after, Haishen began weakening due to increasing shear, and the eye quickly dissipated. Late on November 24, it weakened below typhoon status, and early on November 25 Haishen became extratropical. The remnants continued to the northeast, dissipating on November 26.

Typhoon Pongsona 

Typhoon Pongsona was the last typhoon of the season, and was the second costliest disaster in 2002 in the United States and its territories. It formed on December 2, having originated as an area of convection to the east-southeast of Pohnpei in late November. With a ridge to the north, the depression tracked generally westward for several days, intensifying into Tropical Storm Pongsona on December 3. After an eye developed on December 5, the storm attained typhoon status to the north of Chuuk. Steady intensification continued, until it became more rapid on December 8 while approaching Guam. Around its peak intensity, the eye of the typhoon moved over Guam and Rota. After striking Guam, Pongsona began moving to the north and later to the northeast, quickly weakening due to the presence of dry air and interaction with an approaching mid-latitude storm. After the convection diminished over the center, Pongsona became extratropical early on December 11. Early the next day, it dissipated east of Japan.

On Guam, Pongsona was the third most intense typhoon on record to strike the island, with wind gusts reaching . Damage totaled $700 million, making it one of the five costliest storms on Guam. The typhoon injured 193 people and killed one person. A total of 1,751 houses were destroyed on Guam, and another 6,740 were damaged to some degree. Widespread areas lost water, and the road system was heavily damaged. On neighboring Rota, Pongsona damaged 460 houses and destroyed 114, causing an additional $30 million in damage. Both Guam and the Northern Marianas Islands were declared federal disaster areas, which made federal funding available for repairing storm damage. In Guam, the federal government provided about $125 million in funding for individuals and other programs.

Other systems 
On February 15, a weak tropical depression developed east of Mindanao, according to the JMA; by the next day, the system dissipated. In the beginning of April, a tropical disturbance developed along the southern end of a stationary cold front west of Enewetak Atoll. While gradually organizing, the system produced gale-force wind gusts in the FSM. On April 5, the JTWC initiated advisories on Tropical Depression 04W. The JMA issued its last advisory on April 8.

A tropical depression formed in the South China Sea on May 28, given the name "Dagul" by PAGASA. The JTWC never anticipated significant strengthening, and the system largely consisted of convection displaced to the southeast of a broad circulation. A ridge to the southeast steered the depression to the northeast, and on May 30 the depression made landfall in southwestern Taiwan. The combination of land interaction and wind shear caused dissipation that day.

The JMA monitored a tropical depression east of Iwo Jima on July 25, although by the next day the agency was no longer tracking the system. On August 3, a small circulation was located just off the southeast coast of Japan, which later developed an area of convection over it. The JTWC initiated advisories on Tropical Depression 17W at 06:00 UTC on August 5, describing the system as a "midget cyclone". A mid-level ridge to the southeast steered the depression eastward away from Japan. Unfavorable conditions caused weakening, and the JTWC discontinued advisories six hours after its first warning. Another tropical depression formed on September 21 to the northeast of the Marshall Islands, but dissipated by the next day.

Three non-developing depressions formed in October. The first was classified as a depression by the JMA on October 12 in the South China Sea. It quickly dissipated, although the system dropped heavy rainfall reaching  at a station in the Paracel Islands. It moved westward due to a ridge to the north, and failed to intensify due to weak outflow and dry air. It dissipated on October 19. The day before, another depression formed near the International Date Line. Classified as Tropical Depression 28W by the JTWC, it moved generally northward due to a break in the ridge. Wind shear dissipated the depression on October 20.

Storm names 
Within the western Pacific Ocean, both the JMA and PAGASA assign names to tropical cyclones that develop in the basin, which can result in a tropical cyclone having two names. The PAGASA assigns names to all tropical cyclones that move into or form as a tropical depression in their area of responsibility, located between 135°E and 115°E and between 5°N-25°N, even if the cyclone has had an international name assigned to it. The names of significant tropical cyclones are retired, by both PAGASA and the Typhoon Committee. PAGASA also has an auxiliary naming list, of which the first ten are published, should their list of names be exhausted.

International names 

During the season 24 named tropical cyclones developed in the Western Pacific and were named by the Japan Meteorological Agency, when it was determined that they had become tropical storms. These names were contributed to a list of a 140 names submitted by the fourteen members nations and territories of the ESCAP/WMO Typhoon Committee. All of the names on the list were used for the first time. This is the only time the names Noguri, Changmi, Chataan, Rusa, and Pongsona were used. The former two had their spellings changed while the latter three were retired.

Two central pacific storms, Hurricane Ele 02C and Hurricane Huko 03C, crossed into this basin. They became Typhoon Ele and Typhoon Huko, keeping their original name and "C" suffix in their warnings by JTWC.

Philippines 

The Philippine Atmospheric, Geophysical and Astronomical Services Administration uses its own naming scheme for tropical cyclones in their area of responsibility. PAGASA assigns names to tropical depressions that form within their area of responsibility and any tropical cyclone that might move into their area of responsibility, and the lists are reused every four years. Should the list of names for a given year prove to be insufficient, names are taken from an auxiliary list, the first 10 of which are published each year before the season starts. The names not retired from this list would be used again in the 2006 season.

Retirement 

The names Chataan, Rusa, and Pongsona were retired by the WMO's Typhoon Committee. The names Matmo, Nuri, and Noul were chosen to replace Chataan, Rusa and Pongsona respectively.

Season effects 
The following table does not include unnamed storms, and PAGASA names are in parenthesis. Storms entering from the Central Pacific only include their information while in the western Pacific, and are noted with an asterisk *.

|-
| Tapah (Agaton) ||  || bgcolor=#| || bgcolor=#| || bgcolor=#| || Philippines ||  None ||  None ||
|-
| TD ||  || bgcolor=#| || bgcolor=#| || bgcolor=#| || None || None || None ||
|-
| Mitag (Basyang) ||  || bgcolor=#| || bgcolor=#| || bgcolor=#| || Federated States of Micronesia, Palau ||  ||  || 
|-
| 03W (Caloy) ||  || bgcolor=#| || bgcolor=#| || bgcolor=#| || Philippines ||  ||  || 
|-
| 04W ||  || bgcolor=#| || bgcolor=#| || bgcolor=#| || None || None || None ||
|-
| Hagibis ||  || bgcolor=#| || bgcolor=#| || bgcolor=#| || Caroline Islands, Mariana Islands ||  ||  None || 
|-
| 06W (Dagul) ||  || bgcolor=#| || bgcolor=#| || bgcolor=#| || Philippines, Taiwan || None || None || 
|-
| TD ||  || bgcolor=#| || bgcolor=#| || bgcolor=#| || None || None || None ||
|-
| TD ||  || bgcolor=#| || bgcolor=#| || bgcolor=#| || Ryukyu Islands || None || None ||
|-
| Noguri (Espada) ||  || bgcolor=#| || bgcolor=#| || bgcolor=#| || Japan, Taiwan ||  ||  None || 
|-
| Rammasun (Florita) ||  || bgcolor=#| || bgcolor=#| || bgcolor=#| || China, Korean Peninsula, Ryukyu Islands, Taiwan ||  ||  || 
|-
| Chataan (Gloria) ||  || bgcolor=#| || bgcolor=#| || bgcolor=#| || Chuuk, Guam, Japan ||  ||  || 
|-
| Halong (Inday) ||  || bgcolor=#| || bgcolor=#| || bgcolor=#| || Guam, Philippines, Japan ||  ||  || 
|-
| Nakri (Hambalos) ||  || bgcolor=#| || bgcolor=#| || bgcolor=#| || Philippines, China, Taiwan, Japan ||  None ||  || 
|-
| Fengshen ||  || bgcolor=#| || bgcolor=#| || bgcolor=#| || Japan, China ||  ||  || 
|-
| 13W (Juan) ||  || bgcolor=#| || bgcolor=#| || bgcolor=#| || Philippines ||  ||  || 
|-
| Fung-wong (Kaka) ||  || bgcolor=#| || bgcolor=#| || bgcolor=#| || Japan ||  None ||  None || 
|-
| Kalmaegi ||  || bgcolor=#| || bgcolor=#| || bgcolor=#| || None ||  None ||  None || 
|-
| TD ||  || bgcolor=#| || bgcolor=#| || bgcolor=#| || None || None || None ||
|-
| TD ||  || bgcolor=#| || bgcolor=#| || bgcolor=#| || South China || None || None ||
|-
| Kammuri(Lagalag) ||  || bgcolor=#| || bgcolor=#| || bgcolor=#| || China ||  ||  || 
|-
| 17W ||  || bgcolor=#| || bgcolor=#| || bgcolor=#| || None || None || None ||
|-
| 18W (Milenyo) ||  || bgcolor=#| || bgcolor=#| || bgcolor=#| || Philippines ||  ||  || 
|-
| Phanfone ||  || bgcolor=#| || bgcolor=#| || bgcolor=#| || Japan ||  None ||  None || 
|-
| Vongfong ||  || bgcolor=#| || bgcolor=#| || bgcolor=#| || China ||  ||  || 
|-
| Rusa ||  || bgcolor=#| || bgcolor=#| || bgcolor=#| || Japan, South Korea, North Korea ||  ||  || 
|-
| Sinlaku ||  || bgcolor=#| || bgcolor=#| || bgcolor=#| || Japan, China ||  ||  || 
|-
| Ele ||  || bgcolor=#| || bgcolor=#| || bgcolor=#| || None ||  None ||  None || 
|-
| Hagupit ||  || bgcolor=#| || bgcolor=#| || bgcolor=#| || China ||  ||  || 
|-
| TD ||  || bgcolor=#| || bgcolor=#| || bgcolor=#| || Mariana Islands || None || None ||
|-
| Changmi ||  || bgcolor=#| || bgcolor=#| || bgcolor=#| || None ||  None ||  None || 
|-
| TD ||  || bgcolor=#| || bgcolor=#| || bgcolor=#| || None || None || None ||
|-
| Mekkhala ||  || bgcolor=#| || bgcolor=#| || bgcolor=#| || China ||  ||  None ||
|-
| Higos ||  || bgcolor=#| || bgcolor=#| || bgcolor=#| || Japan, Primorsky Krai ||  ||  || 
|-
| Bavi ||  || bgcolor=#| || bgcolor=#| || bgcolor=#| || None ||  None ||  None || 
|-
| TD ||  || bgcolor=#| || bgcolor=#| || bgcolor=#| || None || None || None ||
|-
| 27W ||  || bgcolor=#| || bgcolor=#| || bgcolor=#| || None || None || None ||
|-
| 28W ||  || bgcolor=#| || bgcolor=#| || bgcolor=#| || None || None || None ||
|-
| TD ||  || bgcolor=#| || bgcolor=#| || bgcolor=#| || Taiwan || None || None ||
|-
| Maysak ||  || bgcolor=#| || bgcolor=#| || bgcolor=#| || None ||  None ||  None || 
|-
| Huko ||  || bgcolor=#| || bgcolor=#| || bgcolor=#| || None ||  None ||  None || 
|-
| Haishen ||  || bgcolor=#| || bgcolor=#| || bgcolor=#| || None ||  None ||  None || 
|-
| TD ||  || bgcolor=#| || bgcolor=#| || bgcolor=#| || None || None || None ||
|-
| Pongsona ||  || bgcolor=#| || bgcolor=#| || bgcolor=#| || Guam, Northern Marianas Islands ||  ||  || 
|-

See also 

 Tropical cyclones in 2002
 List of Pacific typhoon seasons
 2002 Pacific hurricane season
 2002 Atlantic hurricane season
 2002 North Indian Ocean cyclone season
 South-West Indian Ocean cyclone seasons: 2001–02, 2002–03
 Australian region cyclone seasons: 2001–02, 2002–03
 South Pacific cyclone seasons: 2001–02, 2002–03

Notes

References

External links 

 Satellite movie of 2002 Pacific typhoon season
 Japan Meteorological Agency Best Track archive

 
Pacific typhoon seasons
2002 W